Benet's Reader's Encyclopedia of American Literature was published in 1991 by Harper Collins Publishers. The book contains facts on American authors' major and lesser works, summarizes the critical consensus, gives biographical information and often lists secondary biographical and critical works.

See also 
Benet's Reader's Encyclopedia

References

Publication information 
 

1991 non-fiction books
Encyclopedias of literature
HarperCollins books